The 2013 World Touring Car Championship season was the tenth season of the FIA World Touring Car Championship, and the ninth since the series was revived in 2005. The championship, which was reserved for cars run to Super 2000 regulations, began with the Race of Italy on 23 March and concluded with the Race of Macau in support of the Macau Grand Prix at the Guia Circuit on 17 November, after twenty-four races at twelve events.

Yvan Muller secured the Drivers' Championship title in Japan, with two events remaining in the season. Honda won the Manufacturers' Championship. Chevrolet was the defending manufacturers' champion, but it did not support a team in 2013, and thus was unable to defend its title.

James Nash won the Yokohama Drivers' Trophy for independent entries and RML won the Yokohama Teams' Trophy. The Lukoil Racing Team was the defending Yokohama Teams' Trophy winner, but was unable to defend its title as Lukoil closed their own team to support manufacturer Lada Sport team in 2013.

Teams and drivers

Team changes
 Arena Motorsport—who contested the 2012 season as Team Aon—did not compete in 2013 after its owner decided to shut down the team and concentrate its efforts on Formula One team Marussia F1.
 Former Formula One driver, team owner and GP2 Series team owner Adrián Campos entered the World Touring car Championship with two SEAT Leóns prepared by Sunred Engineering.
 Chevrolet announced that they withdrew from the series to concentrate on other projects. This leaves RML Group without the backing of a manufacturer.
 Stefano D'Aste established his own team, PB Motorsport.
 Honda entered the series in 2013 for the full season. JAS Motorsport entered two Honda Civic 1.6Ts on behalf of the manufacturer.
 After competing in FIA GT1 World Championship, Münnich Motorsport entered the World Touring Car Championship in 2013 with three SEAT León WTCC cars.
 After competing in two rounds in 2012, Russian car manufacturer Lada announced its intentions to contest races in 2013 with the Lada Granta WTCC, contesting a full season for the first time since 2009. On 15 November it was announced that the marque would enter a two car team for 2013. However, they later announced that they would enter a third car later of the season.
 NIKA Racing entered the series for the full season with a Chevrolet Cruze 1.6T having previously entered two rounds of the championship since 2010.* Zengő Motorsport switched from entering a BMW 320 TC to the Honda Civic 1.6T for its 2013 campaign.

Driver changes
 Marc Basseng joined the series as a Münnich Motorsport driver, having won the 2012 FIA GT1 World Championship for the team.
 Tom Chilton moved to RML.
 Aleksei Dudukalo joined Lada for the 2013 season after two years with SEAT.
 Robert Huff switched to Münnich Motorsport to defend his championship title, replacing Markus Winkelhock in their lineup.
 Alain Menu left the series and moved into the Porsche Supercup.
 Tiago Monteiro joined Honda full-time for the 2013 season, having taken part in the final three races of 2012 season debuting the Honda entry.
 After a single entry during 2012, René Münnich will make his full-time World Touring Car Championship debut in 2013, racing for Münnich Motorsport.
 James Nash races for Bamboo Engineering in 2013 having raced for Team Aon in 2012.
 Darryl O'Young left Bamboo Engineering to join Tom Coronel at ROAL Motorsport in 2013.
 Gabriele Tarquini deserted Lukoil Racing Team, campaigning with the second Honda entry.

Mid-season changes
 Aleksei Dudukalo lost his seat with Lada Sport Lukoil after the Race of Italy. He was replaced by Russian Touring Car Championship driver Mikhail Kozlovskiy, with the team attributing the decision to replace Dudukalo as being a result of Dudukalo's collision with teammate James Thompson during qualifying for the race of Italy, forcing both Lada Granta WTCC cars out of the event.
 After the Moscow round, Pepe Oriola switched from his SEAT Leon to run an RML prepared Chevrolet Cruze.
 Michel Nykjær split with Nika Racing after the round in Sonoma. He was replaced by Hiroki Yoshimoto.

Calendar
The 2013 championship was contested over twenty-four races, with two races held at each of twelve events throughout the year. The final calendar for the season was released in December 2012.

Calendar changes
 The Race of Morocco was not included on the provisional calendar for 2013, though the provisional calendar was released with a vacant race date. 
 The Race of Portugal returned to the Circuito da Boavista in Porto after being held at the Portimão circuit in 2012.
 The Race of Spain was originally included on the provisional calendar at a venue to be decided. However, the race was removed from the final calendar released in December 2012.
 The Race of Russia made its championship debut at the Moscow Raceway.
 The Race of Brazil was dropped before the start of the season, but was later reinstated. It was then dropped from the calendar again when the Argentine round was confirmed.
 An additional thirteenth round of the championship was added before the start of the season. In May 2013, it was confirmed the Race of Argentina made its championship debut at the Autódromo Termas de Río Hondo. The race in Argentina was confirmed in June, replacing the Brazilian round.

Results and standings

Races

Standings

Drivers' Championship

† – Drivers did not finish the race, but were classified as they completed over 75% of the race distance.

Manufacturers' Championship

Yokohama Trophies
World Touring Car Championship promoter Eurosport Events organized the Yokohama Drivers' Trophy and the Yokohama Teams' Trophy within the 2013 FIA World Touring Car Championship.

Yokohama Drivers' Trophy 

Eligibility for the Yokohama Drivers' Trophy was decided by Eurosport Events, taking into consideration the Team's CV and records, the Driver's CV and records and the car's technical characteristics.

Yokohama Teams' Trophy 

All the teams taking part in the championship were eligible to score points towards the Yokohama Teams' Trophy, with the exception of teams which incorporated a car manufacturer's name in the team's name.

Eurosport Asia Trophy 

† – Drivers did not finish the race, but were classified as they completed over 75% of the race distance.

Footnotes

References

External links

2013 Sporting regulations – FIA World Touring Car Championship (www.fia.com); archived at www.webcitation.org on 22 December 2013
FIA World Touring Car Championship Yokohama Trophy Regulations (www.fiawtcc.com); archived at www.webcitation.org on 23 December 2013
Specific Regulations for Modified Production Cars on Circuits [Super-2000] (www.fia.com); archived at www.webcitation.org on 22 December 2013
2013 FIA World Touring Car Championship – Drivers' Championship & Manufacturers' Championship points tables (www.fia.com); archived at www.webcitation.org on 22 December 2013
2013 FIA World Touring Car Championship – Yokohama Drivers' Trophy, Yokohama Teams' Trophy & Eurosport Asia Trophy points tables (www.fiawtcc.com); archived at www.webcitation.org on 22 December 2013

|}